Luge at the 2022 Winter Olympics will be held at the Xiaohaituo Bobsleigh and Luge Track which is one of the Yanqing cluster venues between 5 and 10 February 2022.

A total of 106 quota spots were distributed to the sport of luge, a decline of four from the 2018 Winter Olympics. A total of four events were contested, one for men, one open event, one for women and one mixed.

Qualification

A maximum of 106 athletes will be allowed to compete at the Games. Countries will assigned quotas using the results of Olympic Qualification World Cup Ranking List from  1 July 2020 to 31 December 2021.

Competition schedule
The following is the competition schedule for all four events.

All times are in local time (UTC+8), according to the official schedule correct as of March 2021. This schedule may be subject to change in due time.

Medal summary
Germany dominated the luge competitions, sweeping all four gold medals, and earning six overall.

Medal table

Events

Participating nations
A total of 110 athletes from 26 nations (including the IOC's designation of ROC for the Russian Olympic Committee) qualified to participate. Ireland will be making its Olympic sport debut.

The numbers in parenthesis represents the number of participants entered.

References

External links
Official Results Book – Luge

Luge at the 2022 Winter Olympics
2022
Luge
Winter Olympics